View from the Top is a 2003 American romantic comedy film directed by Bruno Barreto and starring Gwyneth Paltrow, Christina Applegate, Candice Bergen, Joshua Malina, Mark Ruffalo, Rob Lowe, Mike Myers, and Kelly Preston. The film follows a young woman (Paltrow) from a small town who sets out to fulfill her dream of becoming a flight attendant.

Plot
Donna Jensen is from a small town in Nevada. She wants to escape her miserable, unhappy life of living in a trailer with her alcoholic mother, a former Las Vegas showgirl, and her abusive, alcoholic stepfather. After graduating high school, Donna struggles to make ends meet working as a clerk in a Big Lots store.

After her boyfriend leaves her, Donna sees a TV interview with Sally Weston, a former flight attendant, who has written a memoir called My Life in the Sky. Donna then becomes a flight attendant for a small, seedy California commuter airline called Sierra. She works with Sherry, a senior attendant, and Christine. During this time she first meets Ted. After several months, Donna applies to Royalty Airlines. Sherry and Christine also apply. While Christine and Donna get in, Sherry does not, and remains with Sierra Airlines.

Donna puts her heart and soul into training, and, after meeting Sally Weston, is determined to be assigned to the top route, "Paris, First Class, International". After training, Donna is shocked and disappointed to be assigned to a commuter route in Cleveland while Christine, who struggled during the training, inexplicably has been assigned the high-priority New York City route.

Although Donna is unhappy being in Cleveland, she meets and begins a relationship with Ted. A few months later, Donna runs into Christine in Cleveland. Donna is shocked when Christine happens to empty her handbag and it has stolen Royalty Air items. Even the smallest theft is strictly prohibited by Royalty Airlines and could result in termination. Donna is suspicious that there was some error in her route assignment. With Weston's help, Donna discovers that Christine had switched their test I.D. numbers as they handed in their final exams to the instructor.

Weston then has airline security spy on Christine's flight to see if she engages in any theft. Christine is caught and fired. Donna re-takes the exam, achieving a perfect score. She is then assigned to a Paris, First Class, International route, though it means breaking off her relationship with Ted.

Donna soon realizes that she is lonely and unhappy and misses Ted. With Weston's encouragement, she returns to Cleveland and the two reconcile. The film ends with Donna wishing her passengers well as they land in Cleveland, though she is now a pilot.

Cast

Soundtrack 

 Bonus tracks

Release and reception
View from the Top opened on March 21, 2003 (it was originally scheduled for Christmas 2001, but in light of the September 11 attacks and due to the fact that the story revolves around a flight attendant on numerous planes, the release was pushed back) and grossed $7,009,513 in its opening weekend, ranking number four behind Bringing Down the House, Dreamcatcher, and Agent Cody Banks. The film would eventually gross $15,614,000 domestically and $3,912,014 internationally, totaling $19,526,014 worldwide, below the production budget of $30 million.

On review aggregation website Rotten Tomatoes the film has a rating of 14% based on reviews from 123 critics, with the site's consensus "Uneven in tone and badly edited, View From the Top wastes the talents of its cast and condescends to its characters." Paltrow herself later disparaged the film, calling it "the worst movie ever".

British comedian Richard Ayoade wrote the book Ayoade on Top, an in-depth comic analysis of the film, in 2019.

"Ayoade argues for the canonisation of this brutal masterpiece, a film that celebrates capitalism in all its victimless glory; one we might imagine Donald Trump himself half-watching on his private jet’s gold-plated flat screen while his other puffy eye scans the cabin for fresh, young prey."

References

External links
 
 
 
 
 
 Movie stills

2003 films
2003 romantic comedy films
American romantic comedy films
Films directed by Bruno Barreto
American aviation films
Miramax films
Films postponed due to the September 11 attacks
Films set on airplanes
Films shot in Ohio
Films shot in New York (state)
Films shot in Nevada
Films shot in France
Films set in Nevada
Films about flight attendants
Films scored by Theodore Shapiro
2000s English-language films
Films produced by Brad Grey
2000s American films